Ivan Vasilyevich Kochergin (29 December 1935 – 30 May 2015) was a Russian wrestler who competed in the 1960 Summer Olympics and in the 1968 Summer Olympics.

References

External links
 

1935 births
2015 deaths
Olympic wrestlers of the Soviet Union
Wrestlers at the 1960 Summer Olympics
Wrestlers at the 1968 Summer Olympics
Russian male sport wrestlers
Olympic bronze medalists for the Soviet Union
Olympic medalists in wrestling
Medalists at the 1968 Summer Olympics